Martyn James Snow (born 1968) is a British Anglican bishop. Since 2016, he has been the Bishop of Leicester. He previously served as Bishop of Tewkesbury from 2013 to 2016, and as Archdeacon of Sheffield and Rotherham from 2010 to 2013.

Early life and education
Snow was born in 1968 in Indonesia. He was educated at Sheffield University, where he studied chemistry. He trained for ordination at Wycliffe Hall, Oxford, an Anglican theological college in the evangelical tradition.

Ordained ministry
Snow was made a deacon at Petertide 1995 (2 July) by David Lunn, Bishop of Sheffield, at Sheffield Cathedral and ordained a priest the Petertide following (5 July 1996) by Michael Gear, Bishop of Doncaster at his title church (St Andrew's, Brinsworth). He was an assistant curate at Brinsworth with Catcliffe and Treeton before service with the Church Mission Society in Guinea. He was vicar of Christ Church, Pitsmoor from 2001 to 2010 and area dean of Ecclesfield from 2007.

Episcopal ministry
On 25 September 2013, Snow was consecrated a bishop by Justin Welby, Archbishop of Canterbury, during a service in Westminster Abbey. In October 2013, he started his duties as Bishop of Tewkesbury, a suffragan bishop in the Diocese of Gloucester. He was acting diocesan Bishop of Gloucester from 5 August 2014 until Rachel Treweek took up the role of diocesan bishop in June 2015.

On 15 December 2015, it was announced that Snow would be translated to Leicester in 2016. Snow officially became Bishop of Leicester with the confirmation of his election on 22 February 2016. He then become the youngest diocesan bishop in the Church of England, aged 48. On 14 May 2016, a service of installation was held at Leicester Cathedral during which he was seated on his Cathedra and given the crozier of the Diocese of Leicester.

As from October 2016, Snow has sat on the Church of England's National Safeguarding Steering Group (NSSG).

He became a member of the House of Lords (as a Lord Spiritual) on 6 October 2022.

Views
In 2023, following the news that the House of Bishop's of the Church of England was to introduce proposals for blessing same-sex relationships, he signed an open letter which stated:

References

1968 births
Alumni of the University of Sheffield
Alumni of Wycliffe Hall, Oxford
21st-century Church of England bishops
Archdeacons of Sheffield
Bishops of Tewkesbury
Bishops of Leicester
Living people
Evangelical Anglican bishops
Lords Spiritual
People from Knighton, Leicester
20th-century English Anglican priests